Billimoga Puttaswamy Govinda (born 4 March 1951) was an Indian field hockey player who played as a forward, and a former captain of the Indian national team.

Career
Govinda was considered one of the fastest hockey players during his time and was known for his ball shooting ability. 

Govinda's professional career began in the 1967–68 season with Mohun Bagan. In his inaugural season, the team won the Beighton Cup and the first division. His teammates included Olympians Gurbux Singh and Vece Paes.

Govinda played for India in the three Asian Games: 1970, 1974 and 1978 with India finishing second in all the three of them. He also played in the 1972 Summer Olympics at Munich, 1973 World Cup in Amsterdam, 1975 World Cup at Kuala Lumpur which India won beating Pakistan 2-1 in the Finals and at the Montreal Olympics in 1976.

In 1972, Govinda was selected for the World XI team. He was awarded the Arjuna Award for his contribution to Indian hockey.

He then took up the role of the selector for the national hockey team.

References

External links
B. P. Govinda profile

1951 births
Living people
Olympic field hockey players of India
Field hockey players at the 1972 Summer Olympics
Field hockey players at the 1976 Summer Olympics
Indian male field hockey players
Recipients of the Arjuna Award
Kodava people
People from Kodagu district
Field hockey players from Karnataka
Olympic medalists in field hockey
Asian Games medalists in field hockey
Field hockey players at the 1970 Asian Games
Field hockey players at the 1974 Asian Games
Field hockey players at the 1978 Asian Games
Medalists at the 1972 Summer Olympics
Asian Games silver medalists for India
Olympic bronze medalists for India
Medalists at the 1970 Asian Games
Medalists at the 1974 Asian Games
Medalists at the 1978 Asian Games